Alex Segundo Magallanes Jaimes (born March 1, 1974) is a Peruvian retired footballer who played as an attacking midfielder.

Club career
He last played for Alfonso Ugarte de Puno.

International career
Alex Magallanes made 16 appearances for the Peru national football team.

Honours
Sporting Cristal
Torneo Descentralizado (4): 1994, 1995, 1996, 2002
José Gálvez FBC
Torneo Intermedio: 2011
Segunda División Peruana: 2011

References

External links

1974 births
Living people
Footballers from Lima
Association football midfielders
Peruvian footballers
Peru international footballers
Sporting Cristal footballers
Dundee United F.C. players
Deportes Temuco footballers
Cobreloa footballers
Deportivo Municipal footballers
Cienciano footballers
Sport Boys footballers
Estudiantes de Medicina footballers
Unión Huaral footballers
Club Universitario de Deportes footballers
FBC Melgar footballers
José Gálvez FBC footballers
Sport Huancayo footballers
Ayacucho FC footballers
Peruvian Primera División players
Peruvian Segunda División players
Peruvian expatriate footballers
Expatriate footballers in Chile
Expatriate footballers in Scotland
Peruvian expatriate sportspeople in Chile